Iver Lawson (December 21, 1821 – October 5, 1871) was a Norwegian-American real estate investor and newspaper publisher. Together with John Anderson and Knud Langeland, he was the founder of the Skandinaven newspaper in Chicago.

Biography
Iver Lawson was born as Iver Larson Bø at Bø in Voss, Hordaland, Norway. He migrated to the United States in 1844 with his brother, Steffen Lawson. Two other siblings, Boarky Lawson and Knud Lawson, had migrated earlier.

Iver Lawson came to prosperity buying and selling real estate in Chicago during the mid-19th century. He entered city politics in the 1860s. He was a Chicago City Marshall, a member of the Chicago City Council (representing the 15th Ward from 1864 through 1868) and an Illinois state representative. He was also one of the organizers of the First Lutheran church of Chicago in 1848.

Skandinaven was established by three Norwegian immigrants; John Anderson, Knud Langeland, and Iver Lawson. John Anderson administered the newspaper while Knud Langeland served as the first editor of Skandinaven. Iver Lawson was an investor and landlord who provided a location and facilities.

Personal life
Lawson married Melinda Nordvig. They had two sons, Victor Fremont Lawson (1850-1925) and Iver Norman Lawson, Sr. (1865-1937)
He died on October 5, 1871. After his death, his son, Victor Lawson, took over the administration of his father's estate, which included his real estate holdings and interest in Skandinaven.

Footnotes

Related reading
Strand, Algot E.  (1905)  A History of the Norwegians of Illinois   (Chicago, Illinois: J. Anderson publishing Company) 
Dennis, Charles H. (1935) Victor Lawson, his time and work (Chicago, Illinois: The University of Chicago press)

1821 births
1871 deaths
People from Voss
Norwegian emigrants to the United States
19th-century American newspaper founders
Businesspeople from Chicago
Illinois state senators
American Lutherans
People from Chicago
19th-century American politicians
Journalists from Illinois
Heads of the Chicago Police Department
19th-century Lutherans